Bishopwearmouth Burn or the Barnes Burn is a stream flowing through the city of Sunderland. A tributary of the River Wear, the stream originates between Thorney Close and Hastings Hill farm It proceeds to run through Barnes Park and its extensions before going underground due to modern housing and meeting the river at what was Bishopwearmouth, where it was also referred to as the "Rector's Gill".

See also
Hendon Burn

References

City of Sunderland